The 1915 Virginia Orange and Blue football team represented the University of Virginia as a member of the South Atlantic Intercollegiate Athletic Association (SAIAA) during the 1915 college football season. Led by Harry Varner in his first and only season as head coach, the Orange and Blue compiled an overall record of 8–1 with a mark of 2–0 in conference play, sharing the SAIAA title with Georgetown and Washington and Lee. The only blemish on Virginia's record was a loss to Harvard, whose only loss was to national champion Cornell. The team outscored its opponents 219 to 26 on the season. Virginia halfback Eugene Mayer was the south's first consensus All-American.

Schedule

References

Virginia
Virginia Cavaliers football seasons
South Atlantic Intercollegiate Athletic Association football champion seasons
Virginia Orange and Blue football